Audrey Labeau (born 14 February 1985) is a French diver. She competed in the 10 metre platform event at the 2008 Summer Olympics and in the 10 metre platform event at the 2012 Summer Olympics.

References

French female divers
Divers at the 2008 Summer Olympics
Divers at the 2012 Summer Olympics
Olympic divers of France
1985 births
Living people
Sportspeople from Saint-Germain-en-Laye
21st-century French women